The Northwestern Congolian lowland forests is a tropical moist broadleaf forest ecoregion that spans Cameroon, Gabon, the Republic of Congo, the Central African Republic and a minuscule part of the Democratic Republic of the Congo. It forms part of the larger Congolian rainforests region in Central Africa.  The region is noteworthy for very high levels of species richness and endemism.  It is home to a core population of the critically endangered Western lowland gorilla (Gorilla gorilla gorilla).  There are also large populations of forest elephants.

Location and description
The ecoregion is located in western central Africa, across the meeting of Cameroon, Gabon, Republic of Congo, and the Central African Republic (CAR).  It stretches 500 km west-to-east and 700 km north-to south, set back 250 km from the Gulf of Guinea.  Mean elevation is 530 meters, ranging from 79 meters to 1,451 meters. The highest areas are in the Chaillu Mountains of south Gabon and the Republic of Congo in the south.  Much of the terrain sits on a heavily leached red oxisols.  The region is heavily forested and sparsely populated.

The surrounding ecoregions are the Congolian coastal forests to the west, the Northern Congolian forest–savanna mosaic to the north, the Western Congolian forest–savanna mosaic to the south, and the Western Congolian swamp forests to the east.

Climate
The climate of the ecoregion is Tropical monsoon climate (Köppen climate classification (Am)).  This climate is characterized by relatively even temperatures throughout the year (all months being greater than  average temperature). This climate is mid-way between a tropical rainforest and a tropical savannah.  Minimum temperatures range from 18 to 21 degrees (C) to 27 to 30 degrees (C).  Precipitation ranges from 1,400 mm/year to 2,000 mm/year in the center of the ecoregion.

Flora and fauna
Over 90% of the ecoregion is closed forest of broadleaf evergreen. Another 6% is other types of open or closed forest, and 3% is herbaceous cover. Characteristic tree species are Entandrophragma congoense, Pentaclethera eetveldeana, Pericopsis elata (also known as African teak), and Gilbertiodendron dewevrei. Raffia palm is found along the rivers.  

Primates richness is the highest in Africa; Cameroon alone has 29 species of primate, including the Western lowland gorilla, the vulnerable mandrill (Mandrillus sphinx),  and the endangered Chimpanzee (Pan troglodytes).

Protected areas
A 2017 assessment found that 91,395 km², or 21%, of the ecoregion is within protected areas. 40% of the unprotected area is still forested. Protected areas include:
 Boumba Bek National Park, (Cameroon) 
 Dja Faunal Reserve, (Cameroon)
 Lobéké National Park, (Cameroon)
 Nki National Park (Cameroon),
 Dzanga-Ndoki National Park (Central African Republic),
 Dzanga-Sangha Special Reserve, (Central African Republic)
 Nouabale-Ndoki National Park, (Central African Republic)
 Odzala-Kokoua National Park (Republic of the Congo), and 
 Ivindo National Park, (Republic of the Congo)
 Minkébé National Park, (Republic of the Congo) 
 Mwangne National Park (Gabon).
Dzanga-Sanga, Dzanga-Ndoki, Nouabale-Ndoki, and Lobéké national parks and the Dzanga Sangha Special Reserve form the  transboundary Dzanga-Sangha Complex of Protected Areas that extends across 4,589 km² of Cameroon, Central African Republic, and Republic of the Congo.

External links
Congo Basin Ecoregions, Yale School of Forestry and Environmental Studies

References 

Afrotropical ecoregions
Congolian forests
Ecoregions of Cameroon
Ecoregions of the Central African Republic
Ecoregions of the Republic of the Congo
Ecoregions of Gabon
Rainforests of Africa

Flora of Gabon
Tropical and subtropical moist broadleaf forests